In cricket, a five-wicket haul (also known as a "five-for" or "fifer") refers to a bowler taking five or more wickets in a single innings. This is regarded as a significant achievement. As of May 2019, there have been more than 4100 ODIs have been played, however there are only 14 occasions where a player achieved this feat on his ODI debut. Players from the eight of the twelve teams that have Full member status—Australia, Bangladesh, England, Ireland, South Africa, Sri Lanka, West Indies and Zimbabwe—have taken five-wicket hauls on debut. Sri Lankans have performed this feat on three occasions, while the Bangladeshis and South Africa have two each. In addition, two players from Associate teams—Canada and Namibia—have taken a five-wicket haul on debut. Afghanistan, India, New Zealand and Pakistan are yet to have a debutant take a five-wicket haul.

Sri Lankan cricketer Uvais Karnain was the first to take a five-wicket haul on ODI debut; he took 5 wickets for 26 runs against New Zealand in March 1984. His figures were bettered by Australian cricketer Tony Dodemaide who took 5 wickets while conceding 21 runs in a match against Sri Lanka in January 1988. In 1991, Allan Donald became the first South African cricketer to take an ODI five-wicket haul for his team. Although South Africa lost the game by three wickets, Donald received a man of the match award. Canada cricketer Austin Codrington's tally of 5 wickets for 27 runs against Bangladesh in the group stage of the 2003 Cricket World Cup is the only five-wicket haul taken during the Cricket World Cup; his figures helped Canada secure a 60-run victory. Namibian cricketer Jan Frylinck is the most recent debutant to take a five-wicket haul, with figures of 5 wickets for 13 runs against Oman. South African cricketer Kagiso Rabada took figures of 6 wickets for 16 runs, against Bangladesh in July 2015, which remain the best by a bowler on debut. Of the fourteen occasions a cricketer has taken a five-wicket haul on debut, his team has lost three times.

Key

Five-wicket hauls

Notes

References

One Day International
Five-wicket hauls